Ph.D. is an album by Art Farmer recorded in New York in 1989 and originally released on the Contemporary label.

Reception

Scott Yanow of Allmusic said "The advanced hard bop music has enough unpredictable moments to hold one's interest".

Track listing
All compositions by James Williams except as indicated
 "Ph.D." - 8:09
 "Affaire d'Amour" (Donald Brown) - 6:42
 "Mr. Day's Dream" - 6:02
 "The Summary" (Thad Jones) - 6:10
 "Blue Wail" (Kenny Drew) - 8:31
 "Like Someone in Love" (Johnny Burke, Jimmy van Heusen) - 6:42
 "Rise to the Occasion" - 6:13
 "Ballade Art" (Clifford Jordan) - 4:37

Personnel
Art Farmer - flugelhorn, trumpet
Clifford Jordan - tenor saxophone
James Williams - piano
Kenny Burrell - guitar
Rufus Reid - bass 
Marvin "Smitty" Smith - drums

References 

Contemporary Records albums
Art Farmer albums
1989 albums